= Amiga 64 =

The "Amiga 64" is a term used to incorrectly refer to one, or both, of the Commodore computers:

- The Commodore 64
- The Amiga
